Mäntsälä Airfield is an airfield in Mäntsälä, Finland, about  southeast of Mäntsälä town centre.

See also
List of airports in Finland

References

External links
 VFR Suomi/Finland – Mäntsälä Airfield
 Lentopaikat.net – Mäntsälä Airfield 

Airports in Finland
Airfield
Buildings and structures in Uusimaa